The Umrani are an eastern Baloch tribe of Balochistan, Pakistan.

References 

Baloch tribes